Topshelf Records is an American independent record label started in Peabody, Massachusetts and as of 2015 is now based in San Diego, California.

Topshelf Records has been profiled in the Pittsburgh City Paper, San Diego Reader, San Diego CityBeat, and Pitchfork.

Current artists

Former artists

References

External links 
Topshelf Records (Official Website)

2005 establishments in Massachusetts
American record labels
Companies based in Essex County, Massachusetts
Record labels established in 2005